Marshall Burns Lloyd (March 10, 1858 – August 10, 1927) was an American inventor and manufacturer, best known for inventing the Lloyd Loom which was used for making a popular style of furniture and baby carriages.
He also was noted for filing patents for the production of steel tubing which he sold for $800,000, a substantial amount at the time.
Lloyd sold his loom patents for 3 million dollars in the 1920s.
Lloyd held about 200 patents.

References 

1858 births
1927 deaths
19th-century American inventors
20th-century American inventors
American patent holders